Promalactis spinosicornuta is a moth of the family Oecophoridae. It is found in the Tibet Autonomous Region of China.

The wingspan is about 9 mm. The forewings are ochreous brown, sporadically with black scales. The markings are white sparsely edged with black scales. The hindwings and cilia are greyish brown.

Etymology
The specific name is derived from Latin spinosus (meaning having spines) and cornutus and refers to the numerous cornuti (horns).

References

Moths described in 2013
Oecophorinae
Insects of China